Catherine Millay Coleman Eckel is the Sarah and John Lindsey Professor in the Liberal Arts and University Distinguished Professor in the Department of Economics at Texas A&M University, where she directs the Behavioral Economics and Policy Program. She has been a faculty member at the University of British Columbia, Virginia Tech, and the University of Texas at Dallas, where she founded and oversaw the Center for Behavioral and Experimental Economic Science. Her research focuses on experimental economics, and she has studied charitable giving; cooperation, trust, and risk tolerance in poor, urban settings; the coordination of counter-terrorism policy; gender differences in preferences and behavior; and discrimination by race and gender as evidenced in games of trust. She has received 24 grants, totaling $4.4 million, from the National Science Foundation. The Russel Sage Foundation, John D. and Catherine T. MacArthur Foundation are some of the other foundations that have funded her research.  She was a past-President of the Economic Science Association, the professional organization of experimental economists, and a past-President of the Southern Economic Association.  She has served as a program director for the National Science Foundation, an editor of the Journal of Economic Behavior and Organization (2005-2012), and has served as associate editor or on the editorial boards of twelve journals. Eckel, an award-winning teacher, has advised 15 PhD dissertations, and her past students now hold faculty positions across the globe. She engages her undergraduate students with projects consisting largely of original research.

References

External links 
 Eckel's Website

American women economists
Behavioral economists
Experimental economists
20th-century American economists
21st-century American economists
Texas A&M University faculty
University of Texas at Dallas faculty
University of Virginia alumni
Virginia Commonwealth University alumni
Living people
Economists from Texas
Year of birth missing (living people)
Academic journal editors
20th-century American women
21st-century American women